Iivo Nei (born 31 October 1931 in Tartu) is an Estonian chess master.

In 1947, at the beginning of his career, Nei took 3rd in Leningrad (Saint Petersburg) at the sixth USSR juniors championships won by Viktor Korchnoi. In 1948, he tied for first with Korchnoi in Tallinn (seventh USSR juniors championships). Nei won the Estonian Championship eight times (1951, 1952, 1956, 1960–1962, 1971, and 1974). In 1955, he tied for third through sixth place in Pärnu (Baltic Republics championships), an event won by Paul Keres. In 1960, he tied for 14–15th at the 27th USSR championships in Leningrad won by Korchnoi. Nei won the Baltic Republics championships in 1961 in Palanga, in 1962 in Tartu, in 1963 in Estonia, and in 1964 in Pärnu. In 1964 he also tied for first with Keres in Beverwijk (Corus chess tournament). In 1965 he took second, behind Vladas Mikėnas, in Palanga (Baltic championships).

Nei was awarded the International Master (IM) title in 1964. He was one of Boris Spassky's seconds (along with Efim Geller and Nikolai Krogius) for the 1972 Fischer vs. Spassky World Championship match. He went on to become a trainer, teaching grandmaster Lembit Oll.

References

External links

1931 births
Living people
Estonian chess players
Soviet chess players
Chess International Masters
Sportspeople from Tartu